Richard Neave (born c 1936) is a British expert in forensic facial reconstruction.
Neave became an expert in anatomical art and was on the staff of the Unit of Art in Medicine at the University of Manchester. He has used his skill in recreating faces from skulls in police forensic work and in producing images of historical figures. One of his reconstructions was of a prehistoric bog body known as Yde Girl. In 1998, a murder investigation resulted in a successful prosecution as a result of Neave's work. Neave's archaeological reconstructions include Philip II of Macedon and Midas. In 2001, the television program Son of God used one of three first-century Jewish skulls from a leading department of forensic science in Israel to depict Jesus in a new way. Neave constructed a face using forensic anthropology which suggested that Jesus would have had a broad face and large nose, and differed significantly from the traditional depictions of Jesus in Renaissance art.

Notable Works

 Jesus, founder of Christianity, c. 4 BC 
 Karen Price, Welsh murder victim (also known as "Little Miss Nobody")
 King Midas, c. 2000 BCE
 Lindow Man, bog body from England, c. 2 BCE
 Mary Rose skulls, c. 1545
 Nesyamun, Egyptian mummy, c. 1100 BCE
 Philip II of Macedon, c. 400 BCE 
 Sensaos, Egyptian maiden c. 109 CE 
 Yde Girl, bog body from the Netherlands, c. 54 BCE

References

1936 births
Forensic artists
Academics of the University of Manchester
Living people
Artists from Manchester